Vera Mary Brittain (29 December 1893 – 29 March 1970) was an English Voluntary Aid Detachment (VAD) nurse, writer, feminist, socialist and pacifist. Her best-selling 1933 memoir Testament of Youth recounted her experiences during the First World War and the beginning of her journey towards pacifism.

Life and work
Born in Newcastle-under-Lyme, Brittain was the daughter of a well-to-do paper manufacturer, (Thomas) Arthur Brittain (1864–1935) and his wife, Edith Mary (Bervon) Brittain (1868–1948). Her father was a director of family-owned paper mills in Hanley and Cheddleton. Her mother was born in Aberystwyth, Wales, the daughter of an impoverished musician, John Inglis Bervon.

When she was 18 months old, her family moved to Macclesfield, Cheshire, and ten years later, in 1905, they moved again, to the spa town of Buxton in Derbyshire. Growing up, her only sibling, her brother Edward, nearly two years her junior, was her closest companion. From the age of 13, she attended boarding school at St Monica's, Kingswood, Surrey where her mother's sister, Aunt Florence (Miss Bervon) was co-principal with Louise Heath-Jones, who had attended Newnham College, Cambridge.

After two years as a 'provincial debutante', Brittain overcame her father's objections and went up to Somerville College, Oxford to read English Literature. By this time war had broken out and Brittain had become close to one of her brother's friends from Uppingham School, Roland Leighton. Finding her Oxford studies increasingly an irrelevance as her male contemporaries volunteered for war, she delayed her degree after one year in the summer of 1915 to work as a Voluntary Aid Detachment (VAD) nurse for much of the First World War. She served initially at the Devonshire Hospital in Buxton, and later in London, Malta and in France where she was stationed close to the front at Etaples and where she nursed German prisoners of war, a significant staging post on her journey towards internationalism and onto pacifism.

Roland Leighton, who became her fiancé in August 1915, close friends Victor Richardson and Geoffrey Thurlow, and finally her brother Edward were all killed in the war. Many of their letters to each other are reproduced in the book Letters from a Lost Generation. In one letter Leighton speaks for his generation of public school volunteers when he writes that he feels the need to play an "active part" in the war.

Returning to Oxford in 1919 to read history, Brittain found it difficult as 'a war survivor' to adjust to life in postwar society. She met Winifred Holtby at Somerville, and a close friendship developed. They both aspired to become established on the London literary scene, and shared various London flats after coming down from Oxford. Eventually Holtby would become part of the Brittain-Catlin household after Brittain's marriage. The bond lasted until Holtby's death from kidney failure in 1935. Other literary contemporaries at Somerville included: Dorothy L. Sayers, Hilda Reid, Margaret Kennedy and Sylvia Thompson.

In 1925, Brittain married George Catlin, a political scientist (1896–1979). Their son, John Brittain-Catlin (1927–1987), whose relationship with his mother steadily deteriorated as he got older, was an artist, painter, businessman and the author of the posthumously published autobiography Family Quartet, which appeared in 1987. Their daughter, born 1930, was the former Labour Cabinet Minister, later Liberal Democrat peer, Shirley Williams (1930–2021), one of the "Gang of Four" rebels on the Social Democratic wing of the Labour Party who founded the SDP in 1981. Like Brittain, George Catlin was raised Anglican, as his father was an Anglican clergyman, but unlike her, he had converted to the Catholic Church prior to the 1920s.

Brittain's first published novel, The Dark Tide (1923), created scandal as it caricatured dons at Oxford, especially at Somerville. In 1933, she published the work for which she became famous, Testament of Youth, followed by Testament of Friendship (1940)— her tribute to and biography of Winifred Holtby —and Testament of Experience (1957), the continuation of her own story, which spanned the years between 1925 and 1950. Vera Brittain based many of her novels on actual experiences and actual people. In this regard, her novel Honourable Estate (1936) was autobiographical, dealing with Brittain's failed friendship with the novelist Phyllis Bentley, her romantic feelings for her American publisher George Brett Jr, and her brother Edward's death in action on the Italian Front in 1918. Brittain's diaries from 1913 to 1917 were published in 1981 as Chronicle of Youth. Some critics have argued that Testament of Youth often differs markedly from Brittain's writings during the war, especially in respect of her attitudes towards the war, which were more conventional in 1914–18.

In the 1920s,she was a widely published journalist, in Time and Tide and many other newspapers and journals. At this time she also became a regular speaker on behalf of the League of Nations Union, supporting the idea of collective security. However, in June 1936, in the wake of the bestsellerdom of Testament of Youth on both sides of the Atlantic, she was invited to speak at a vast peace rally at Maumbury Rings in Dorchester, where she shared a platform with various pacifists, including sponsors of the Peace Pledge Union, the largest pacifist organisation in Britain: Dick Sheppard, George Lansbury, Laurence Housman, and Donald Soper. Afterwards, Sheppard invited her to join the Peace Pledge Union as sponsor. Following six months' careful reflection, she replied in January 1937 to say she would. Later that year, Brittain also joined the Anglican Pacifist Fellowship. Her newly found pacifism, increasingly Christian in inspiration, came to the fore during the Second World War, when she began the series of Letters to Peacelovers.

She was a practical pacifist in the sense that she helped the war effort by working as a fire warden and by travelling around the country raising funds for the Peace Pledge Union's food relief campaign. She was vilified for speaking out against saturation bombing of German cities through her 1944 booklet, published as Seed of Chaos in Britain and as Massacre by Bombing in the United States. In 1945, the Nazis' Black Book of nearly 3,000 people to be immediately arrested in Britain after a German invasion was shown to include her name.

From the 1930s onwards, Brittain was a regular contributor to the pacifist magazine Peace News. She eventually became a member of the magazine's editorial board and during the 1950s and 1960s was "writing articles against apartheid and colonialism and in favour of nuclear disarmament".

In November 1966, she suffered a fall in a badly lit London street en route to a speaking engagement at St Martin-in-the-Fields. She attended the engagement, but afterwards found she had fractured her left arm and broken the little finger of her right hand. These injuries began a physical decline in which her mind became more confused and withdrawn.
Around this time the BBC interviewed her; when asked of her memories of Roland Leighton, she replied "who is Roland"?

Brittain never fully got over the death in June 1918 of her beloved brother, Edward. She died in Wimbledon on 29 March 1970, aged 76. Her will requested that her ashes be scattered on Edward's grave on the Asiago Plateau in Italy – "...for nearly 50 years much of my heart has been in that Italian village cemetery"— and her daughter honoured this request in September 1970. Some of her ashes were buried in 1979 in the grave of her husband Sir George Catlin in the churchyard of St James the Great, at Old Milverton in Warwickshire.

Cultural legacy
She was portrayed by Cheryl Campbell in the 1979 BBC2 television adaptation of Testament of Youth.

Songwriter and fellow Anglican Pacifist Fellowship member Sue Gilmurray wrote a song in Brittain's memory, titled "Vera".

In 1998, Brittain's First World War letters were edited by Alan Bishop and Mark Bostridge and published under the title Letters from a Lost Generation. They were also adapted by Bostridge for a Radio Four series starring Amanda Root and Rupert Graves.

Because You Died, a new selection of Brittain's First World War poetry and prose, edited by Mark Bostridge, was published by Virago in 2008 to commemorate the ninetieth anniversary of the Armistice.

On 9 November 2008, BBC One broadcast an hour-length documentary on Brittain as part of its Remembrance Day programmes hosted by Jo Brand titled A Woman in Love and War: Vera Brittain, where she was portrayed by Katherine Manners.

In February 2009, it was reported that BBC Films was to adapt Brittain's memoir, Testament of Youth, into a feature film. Irish actress Saoirse Ronan was cast to play Brittain at first. However, in December 2013, it was announced that Swedish actress Alicia Vikander would be playing Brittain in the film, which was released at the end of 2014 as part of the First World War commemorations. The film also starred Kit Harington, Colin Morgan, Taron Egerton, Alexandra Roach, Dominic West, Emily Watson, Joanna Scanlan, Hayley Atwell, Jonathan Bailey and Anna Chancellor. David Heyman, producer of the Harry Potter films, and Rosie Alison were the producers.

On 9 November 2018, a Wall Street Journal opinion commentary by Aaron Schnoor honoured the poetry of the First World War, including Brittain's poem "Perhaps".

Plaques marking Brittain's former homes can be seen at 9 Sidmouth Avenue, Newcastle-under-Lyme; 151 Park Road, Buxton; Doughty Street, Bloomsbury; and 117 Wymering Mansions, Maida Vale, west London. There is also a plaque in the Buxton Pavilion Gardens, commemorating Brittain's residence in the town, though the dates shown on the plaque for her time there are incorrect.

Vera Brittain's archive was sold in 1971 to McMaster University in Hamilton, Ontario. A further collection of papers, amassed during the writing of the authorised biography of Brittain, was donated to Somerville College Library, Oxford, by Paul Berry and Mark Bostridge.

Selected bibliography
 1923 – The Dark Tide
 1929 – Halcyon: Or, The Future of Monogamy (To-day and To-morrow pamphlet series)
 1933 – Testament of Youth
 1936 – Honourable Estate
 1940 – Testament of Friendship
 1942 - Humiliation With Honour
 1944 – Seed of Chaos (Massacre by Bombing: U.S. title)
 1957 – Testament of Experience
 1981 – Chronicle of Youth: The War Diary, 1913–1917, edited by Alan Bishop with Terry Smart
 1985 - Testament of a Generation. The Journalism of Vera Brittain and Winifred Holtby, edited by Paul Berry and Alan Bishop
 1998 – Letters from a Lost Generation, edited by Alan Bishop and Mark Bostridge
 2008 - Because You Died. Poetry and Prose of the First World War and After, edited and introduced by Mark Bostridge

Biographies
Vera Brittain by Hilary Bailey. Harmondsworth, Middlesex, England: Penguin Books, 1987. 
Vera Brittain: A Life, by Paul Berry and Mark Bostridge, Chatto & Windus, 1995, Pimlico, 1996, Virago 2001, 2008 .
Vera Brittain: A Feminist Life, by Deborah Gorham, University of Toronto Press, 2000. .
Vera Brittain and the First World War, by Mark Bostridge, Bloomsbury, 2014.

See also
 List of peace activists

Notes

References
Brief Biography by Paul Berry, her literary executor, in the foreword to Testament of Experience, 1980 Virago edition.
Profile of Vera Brittain at Peace Pledge Union website. Accessed June 2008
The making of a peacenik, Mark Bostridge, The Guardian, 30 August 2003. Accessed June 2008

External links

 
 
 Vera Brittain's archives are held at McMaster University
 Mark Bostridge, Vera Brittain's biographer, on distortions in the memoirs of the First World War, including Testament of Youth 
The Vera Brittain Collection in The First World War Poetry Digital Archive by Oxford University contains images of Brittain's War poetry manuscripts, letters, diary, plus a searchable text corpora.
 Images of Vera Brittain at JAMD.
 Biography and List of Works at Litweb.
 
 

1893 births
1970 deaths
20th-century English memoirists
20th-century English novelists
20th-century English women writers
Alumni of Somerville College, Oxford
Anglican pacifists
Anglican socialists
Anglican writers
British women in World War I
British women memoirists
English Anglicans
English anti-war activists
English Christian pacifists
English nurses
English people of Welsh descent
English socialist feminists
English suffragists
English women non-fiction writers
English women novelists
English women poets
English World War I poets
National Council for Civil Liberties people
Non-interventionism
People from Newcastle-under-Lyme
Testament of Youth
Female nurses in World War I